Tetracamphilius pectinatus is a species of loach catfish that is found in the Central African Republic and the Democratic Republic of the Congo.  It reaches a length of 3.4 cm and has a serrated pectoral fin spine (the serrae are very small) which lacks a locking mechanism. It also has a colour pattern consisting of a series of bands with a paler inner part and darkened margins; the dark narrow bands are a dark chocolate brown, the dorsum of the head and areas between the narrow bands are tan or orangish tan, and the abdomen and other pale areas are cream-colored.

References 

 

Amphiliidae
Catfish of Africa
Fish described in 2003
Taxa named by Tyson R. Roberts